Santiago de Cassurrães is a former civil parish in the municipality of Mangualde, Portugal. In 2013, the parish merged into the new parish Santiago de Cassurrães e Póvoa de Cervães.

References

Former parishes of Mangualde